Gogmagog may refer to:

 Gogmagog (band), a British supergroup
 Gogmagog (giant), a giant in British folklore
 Gog Magog Hills
 Gog and Magog